The EN 234/235, until 2013 named Allegro Tosca, is an overnight train jointly operated by the Austrian Federal Railways and Trenitalia under the EuroNight brand. It runs  from Wien Hbf in Vienna to Roma Termini in Rome, with thru-cars to Milano Centrale in Milan.

Route
The Allegro Tosco starts its southwest-bound journey during the evening at Wien Hbf station in Vienna.,then after few minues the train makes its first stop at Wien Meidling. The train heads southwest through Vienna's suburbs at high speeds, along the main line of the Vienna S-Bahn, until it makes its second stop at Wiener Neustadt. After Wiener Neustadt, the train leaves the metropolitan landscape and heads into the mountains of the Eastern Alps. After passing the town of Payerbach the Allegro Tosca decreases its speed as it starts to climb up several hundred feet winding its way through the mountainous terrain. The Allegro Tosca passes through small towns and villages until it reaches Bruck an der Mur, making a short stop. It continues via Villach Hauptbahnhof and Tarvisio border station on the Pontebbana line.

At Venezia Mestre, the train is split up, with a section continuing after a waiting time towards Milano Centrale. The main section of the train continues towards Bologna Centrale where it is coupled together with the City Night Line Lupus from München Hauptbahnhof. The train terminates at Roma Termini station.

Since December 2013, this train lost name.

Train compositions
The train is composed of one or two sleeping cars type MUn with compartments of up to three berths and one deluxe compartment with private bathroom, couchette cars with six berth compartments and coaches with six seat compartments that can also be used for morning or evening travel within Austria. The sleeping-car to Milano is a rebuilt T2S type with two-berth compartments and two deluxe compartments. On certain days in summer, the train carries autoracks from Wien Hauptbahnhof to Verona Porta Nuova. All rolling stock belongs to the Austrian Federal Railways.

External links
 Historical train compositions 2015: EN 234 Rome-Wien EN 235 Wien-Rome
 Historical train compositions 2014: EN 234 Rome-Wien EN 235 Wien-Rome
 Historical train compositions 2013: EN 234 Rome-Wien EN 235 Wien-Rome
 Historical train compositions 2012: EN 234 Rome-Wien EN 235 Wien-Rome
 Historical train compositions 2011: EN 234 Rome-Wien EN 235 Wien-Rome
 Historical train compositions 2010: EN 234 Rome-Wien EN 235 Wien-Rome
 Historical train compositions 2009: EN 234 Rome-Wien EN 235 Wien-Rome
 Historical train compositions 2006: EN 234 Rome-Wien EN 235 Wien-Rome

References

1993 establishments in Austria